"Call My Name" is a single by Swedish singer, songwriter, pianist, and model Tove Styrke, released from her debut studio album. The single was released on 19 August 2011 on digital download. The song peaked at number 28 on the Swedish Singles Chart.

Music video
A music video to accompany the release of "Mojvideo" 011, at a total length of three minutes and fifty-one seconds.

Track listings
Digital download
 "Call My Name" - 3:43
 "High and Low" (Taped Remix)  - 6:08
 "High and Low" (Taped Radio Edit) - 3:35

Remix EP (Germany)
 "Call My Name" - 3:43
 "Call My Name"  (Dimitri Vangelis & Wyman Remix Radio Edit)  - 4:00
 "Call My Name"  (Cashmere Cat Remix)  - 6:28
 "Call My Name"  (Instrumental)  - 3:42
 "Call My Name"  (Video)

Chart performance

Release history

References

2011 singles
Tove Styrke songs
2010 songs
Sony Music singles
Songs written by Peter Ågren
Songs written by Tove Styrke